The Volume is a sports-talk podcast network, co-produced by Colin Cowherd and iHeartRadio.

History 
The Volume was launched February 1, 2021, featuring its flagship program, The Colin Cowherd Podcast, on which Colin Cowherd breaks down the biggest sports stories through relatable analogies, and interviews guests from across the world of sports.

In March 2021, The Volume entered into a collaboration partnership with Action Network to bring sports fans a slate of premium sports gambling podcasts.

Content 
The Volume currently has multiple podcasts, including The Draymond Green Show, hosted by NBA player Draymond Green, and Inside the Garage, a show hosted by four Notre Dame football players namely Kyle Hamilton, Cam Hart, Conor Ratigan and KJ Wallace. Other podcast hosts on The Volume include former NFL player Aqib Talib, Renée Paquette, Chris Mannix, Cooper Manning, Olivia Moody, and Alex Monaco.

References

External links
 Official website

Sports podcasts
Podcasting companies